is a Shingon temple in Ogōri, Fukuoka Prefecture, Japan.

History
The temple was founded on the order of Empress Kōken in 729 and consecrated by the monk Gyōki. In 1586, however, the temple was temporally shut down in the fire caused by war. Then, in the early Edo period, the main hall was rebuilt by Arima Tadayori (有馬忠頼), the second feudal lord of Kurume Domain.

Today, the temple and its surrounding grounds receive more than 30 thousand visitors annually.

Frog figurines
A chief priest of Nyoirin-ji Temple went on a trip to China and he brought back the frog figurines made out of jade. Now more than 5000 figurines placed in the temple.

Nyoirin Kannon
The statue of the Nyoirin Kannon is said that it was carved by the monk Gyōki. As a "hidden Buddha" it is concealed and can only be seen during the year of snake every 12 years.

References

External links
Nyoirin Temple - Fukuoka Prefecture Tourist Association

Buddhist temples in Fukuoka Prefecture
Shingon Buddhism
Buildings and structures in Fukuoka Prefecture
Tourist attractions in Fukuoka Prefecture